103-form Yang family t'ai chi ch'uan, also called the Traditional Form (or, Long Form), is a prescribed sequence of moves used to practice Yang-style t'ai chi ch'uan.

T'ai chi forms

The different slow motion solo form training sequences of t'ai chi ch'uan are the best known manifestation of t'ai chi for the general public.  In English, they are usually called the hand form or just the form;  in Mandarin it is usually called ch'üan.  They are usually performed slowly and are designed to string together an inventory of important techniques, and to promote relaxation, as well as other foundational principles.

Duration
This sequence of moves, when performed at its prescribed speed, usually takes approximately 25 to 30 minutes to complete.

Differences between schools

The following is an English translation from Chinese of the form list used by the current Yang family teachers. Other Yang style schools may have significantly different enumeration schemes. The moves can also add up to 85, 88, 108, 113 or 150 depending on how they are counted. The book called Yang Shi Taijiquan (Yang style T'ai chi ch'uan), by Fu Zhongwen, breaks the form into each of its discrete movements.

Yang-style 103-Form list of Postures

The 103 postures of the Yang family style of t'ai chi ch'uan are as follows:

See also
 Two-person Pushing Hands

References

External links
 Traditional Yang Style Tai Chi Chuan 103 Movement Hand Form

Tai chi styles
Neijia